Eudora Quartey-Koranteng (died 20 October 2021) was the Ambassador Extraordinaire of the Republic of Ghana to Italy. She presented her credentials to the President of the Republic of Italy in 2019.  She had concurrent accreditation to Slovenia, Serbia, Montenegro, and the Food and Agriculture Organization.

She died on 20 October 2021.

References 

20th-century births
2021 deaths
Ghanaian women ambassadors
Ambassadors of Ghana to Italy
Ambassadors of Ghana to Slovenia
Ambassadors of Ghana to Serbia
Ambassadors of Ghana to Montenegro
Representatives of Ghana to the Food and Agriculture Organization
Year of birth missing
21st-century diplomats